Lotus tea is an infusion made from lotus leaves, flowers, roots, fruit, seeds, or embryos. It is known as liánchá in Chinese and yeoncha in Korean. It is also known as trà sen in Vietnamese.

Lotus leaf tea 
Lotus leaf tea, called yeonnip-cha in Korean, is a tea made from young leaves of lotus. Leaves for lotus tea are often heat-treated (either by steaming or roasting) before being dried.

Lotus flower tea 
Lotus flower tea, called yeonkkot-cha or yeonhwa-cha in Korean, is a tea made from lotus flower. Often, a fresh whole flower is used to make tea. In Korean temple cuisine, this type of lotus flower tea symbolizes the blossoming of Buddhist enlightenment.

Lotus fruit tea 
Lotus fruit tea, called yeonbang-cha in Korean, is a tea made by infusing dried lotus fruits.

Lotus seed tea 
Lotus seed tea, called yeonbap-cha, yeonssi-cha, or yeonja-cha in Korean, is a tea made by infusing lotus seeds, which are steamed and dried. For two to three cups of tea,  of lotus seeds are simmered in  water over low heat.

Lotus embryo tea 

Lotus root tea 
Lotus root tea, called yeongeun-cha in Korean, is a tea made by infusing dried lotus root (rhizome) slices or mixing lotus root powder in hot water. Lotus root powder for tea can be made by either by drying lotus root juice, or grinding dried lotus root slices into powder.

References 

Chinese teas
Flower tea
Herbal tea
Korean tea
Vietnamese tea